Brian Sharp (21 December 1939 – 13 March 2004) was an  Australian rules footballer who played with Geelong in the Victorian Football League (VFL).

Notes

External links 

1939 births
2004 deaths
Australian rules footballers from Victoria (Australia)
Geelong Football Club players